Whispering Winds Catholic Conference Center is a camp in Southern California, United States, where Catholic followers can seek for refuge. Founded by Don Kojis and Dr. Jerry Tisi, the camp is located in the Cleveland National Forest and in the Cuyamaca Mountains and is approximately five miles south of Julian. It is served by Harrison Park Road, which can be accessed by State Route 79.

External links 
 Whispering Winds - Welcome